The 2019 National Collegiate Athletic Association (NCAA) Division I Football Championship Subdivision (FCS) football rankings consists of two human polls, in addition to various publications' preseason polls. Unlike the Football Bowl Subdivision (FBS), college football's governing body, the NCAA, bestows the national championship title through a 24-team tournament. The following weekly polls determine the top 25 teams at the NCAA Division I Football Championship Subdivision level of college football for the 2019 season. The STATS poll is voted by media members while the Coaches' Poll is determined by coaches at the FCS level.

The STATS preseason poll was released on August 5, 2019, with defending champions North Dakota State earning 142 of the 160 allotted first-place votes, while James Madison earned fourteen, defending runners-up Eastern Washington earned three, and South Dakota State earned one.

Legend

STATS poll

Coaches' poll

References

Rankings
NCAA Division I FCS football rankings